Davey Woods State Nature Preserve is a  nature preserve in Champaign County, Ohio. The preserve is classified as an old-growth forest.

It is one of the best woodlots remaining in this part of Ohio. Named in honor of the Davey Tree Expert Company which, through The Nature Conservancy, provided half the funding to acquire this site in 1989.

The terrain is hilly for this part of the state and offers hiking and the opportunity to catch the glimpse of native wildlife.

References

External links
U.S. Geological Survey Map at the U.S. Geological Survey Map Website. Retrieved December 19th, 2022.

Ohio State Nature Preserves
Protected areas of Champaign County, Ohio